Ittifoq is an urban-type settlement in Namangan Region, Uzbekistan.

References

Populated places in Namangan Region